Gilbert C. Williams (born 1953) is an Irish former hurler. At club level he played with Kilruane MacDonaghs and was also a member of the Tipperary senior hurling team.

Career

Williams first played Gaelic football and hurling at juvenile and underage levels with the Kilruane MacDonaghs. He captained the club's minor team to the Tipperary MAHC title in 1971 before later winning consecutive Tipperary U21AHC titles. Williams was at left wing-back on the Kilruane MacDonaghs team that won the All-Ireland Club Championship title in 1986, having earlier won four Tipperary SHC titles and a Tipperary SFC title in 1975.

Williams first appeared on the inter-county scene as a member of the Tipperary minor hurling team in 1971. He later spent three seasons with the under-21 team, however, his underage career ended without success. Williams's performances at club level earned his inclusion on the senior team for the 1979 Munster SHC campaign.

Honours

Kilruane MacDonaghs
All-Ireland Senior Club Hurling Championship: 1986
Munster Senior Club Hurling Championship: 1985
Tipperary Senior Football Championship: 1975
Tipperary Senior Hurling Championship: 1977, 1978, 1979, 1985
Tipperary Under-21 A Hurling Championship: 1973, 1974
Tipperary Minor A Hurling Championship: 1971 (c)

References

External link

 Gilbert Williams player profile

1953 births
Living people
Kilruane MacDonaghs hurlers
Kilruane MacDonaghs Gaelic footballers
Tipperary inter-county hurlers